Dyer's oak may refer to two species of oak tree:

 Quercus velutina of Eastern North America
 Quercus lusitanica of Morocco, Portugal, and Spain